Giuseppe Arzilli (born 20 February 1941 in San Marino) is a Sammarinese politician, and was formerly the Captain Regent San Marino.

He served three six-month terms, the first from October 1986 to April 1987, the second from October 1999 to April 2000, and the third from October 2004 to April 2005. He is a member of the Sammarinese Christian Democratic Party.

External links
Parliamentary Assembly of the Council of Europe: profile

Captains Regent of San Marino
Members of the Grand and General Council
1941 births
Politicians of Catholic political parties
20th-century politicians
21st-century Sammarinese politicians
Living people
Sammarinese Christian Democratic Party politicians
Recipients of the Order of the Star of Romania